Plexechinus is a genus of echinoderms belonging to the monotypic family Plexechinidae.

The genus has almost cosmopolitan distribution.

Species:

Plexechinus aoteanus 
Plexechinus cinctus 
Plexechinus hirsutus 
Plexechinus parvus 
Plexechinus planus 
Plexechinus spectabilis 
Plexechinus sulcatus

References

Holasteroida
Echinoidea genera